Agnese Ghisi (died before August 1282), was Regent of Karystos in ca. 1266-69. She was a sister of Andrea Ghisi and Geremia Ghisi, and probably the wife of Othon de Cicon.

She was a member of the Ghisi family. She had a son, Guidotto, and a daughter, Anfelise. She became regent of Karystos for her son ca. 1266-69 after the death of her husband; the city was however captured by Licario ca. 1277 and Guidotto taken prisoner.

She died before August 18 1282, when she is mentioned as defunct in her nephew's testament.

References 
 

13th-century Venetian women
Year of death unknown
Year of birth unknown
Agnese
13th-century Venetian people
13th-century women rulers